Allianz was a group of Swiss artists which formed in 1937.

The Allianz group advocated the concrete art theories of Max Bill with more emphasis on color than their Constructivist counterparts.

Their first group exhibition, Neue Kunst in der Schweiz, was held in Kunsthalle Basel in 1937 (January 9-February 2) and was followed by a second at the Kunsthaus in Zürich in 1942 and then in 1947 (October 18-November 23). Further shows were held at the Galerie des Eaux Vives in Zürich, starting with two in 1944. The founder and Director of Galerie des Eaux Vives, as well as a prominent founding artist of the Allianz, was John Konstantin Hansegger, born in St. Gallen in 1908.

The Almanach Neuer Kunst in der Schweiz, published by the group in 1941, showed reproductions of their works with those of artists such as Paul Klee, Le Corbusier, Gérard Vulliamy and Kurt Seligmann. The publication included texts by Bill, Leuppi, Le Corbusier, Seligmann, Sigfried Giedion, Gérard Vulliamy and others. Editions des Eaux-Vives Zurich (connected with the Galerie) published important illustrated bulletins of Allianz shows with texts by Hansegger, Johannes Sorge, Max Bill and Ugo Pirogallo.

Allianz exhibitions continued into the 1950s.

Allianz artists
 Max Bill
 Camille Graeser
Hansegger
 André Evard
 Fritz Glarner
 Max Huber
 Leo Leuppi
 Richard Paul Lohse
 Verena Loewensberg

References

Modern art
Swiss art
1937 in Switzerland